"Hallelujah" is a song by American solo project Panic! at the Disco. It was released as a single on April 19, 2015 through Fueled by Ramen as the first single from the band's fifth studio album Death of a Bachelor. "Hallelujah" debuted at number 40 on the Billboard Hot 100 selling over 71,000 copies, becoming the band's second top-40 hit single and the first in nine years since "I Write Sins Not Tragedies" was released in 2006.

It has been digitally streamed over 165 million times on Spotify alone. "Hallelujah" was nominated for Song of the Year at the 2016 Alternative Press Music Awards.

Background

When asked about the meaning of the song, Brendon Urie responded saying, "I mean, I grew up in a religious family and, like, that was a very big part of my life, and still, very much, is even though I don't affiliate with any specific religion. It's just, for me, you know, the spirituality of being able to own up to your sins, as they're called, and take responsibility for your actions really hit me this time around, and so that song really is about that, it's, you know, taking responsibility for things that you felt guilty for in the past and just owning it, because, now, that's a piece of you and you can't get rid of that history, so, that's really what it was. But it was a chance to, kind of also, you know, there's a little tagline in there that I throw out to our fans, I like to call them 
'my sinners', and I'm a fellow sinner, and so I think that's a little special little throw-out to them." Urie later stated, "When you have to own up to your mistakes, you know, praise that; as long as you take responsibility for your actions, everything else seems it can fall into place if you have that same attitude, so, that's really what it was, it's kind of a play on just, 'yeah, you know, hallelujah, I'm not a sinner', but we are, I mean the song is definitely about that".

The opening of the song is taken from the Chicago song "Questions 67 and 68".

It is the band's first song since the departure of drummer Spencer Smith. Despite the song being released during Dallon Weekes's tenure in the band, it is unknown if he recorded bass on the song.

The song was performed live for the first time at the 7th annual Shorty Awards on Monday, April 20, 2015. At the Shorty Awards, the band also performed the single "Miss Jackson". The band also performed the single at the 2015 Alternative Press Music Awards along with a cover of "Bohemian Rhapsody" by Queen.

Music video

An audio video was uploaded to Fueled by Ramen's YouTube channel featuring racially diverse iOS preaching emojis.

On July 7, 2015, a music video was released for the song. The video is inspired by the game Monument Valley. As of December 2022, the music video has surpassed 73 million views.

Track listing
All tracks written by Brendon Urie, Jake Sinclair, Morgan Kibby, Aron Wright and Imad-Roy El-Amine. "Hallelujah" samples "Questions 67 and 68" written by Robert Lamm and performed by Chicago.

Personnel
Panic! at the Disco
Brendon Urie – lead and backing vocals, guitar, bass guitar, keyboards
Additional personnel
Jake Sinclair – background vocals
White Sea – background vocals
Mark Stepro – drums
Rob Mathes – horn arrangement

Chart performance

Weekly charts

Year-end charts

Certifications

References

Panic! at the Disco songs
2015 singles
2015 songs
Songs written by Brendon Urie
Fueled by Ramen singles
Songs written by Robert Lamm
Songs written by Morgan Kibby
Songs written by Jake Sinclair (musician)